Jakobson may refer to:

 Jakobson (surname), a surname (including a list of people with the name)
 Jakobson Shipyard, a defunct shipyard formerly based in New York

See also

 Jacobson (disambiguation)
 Jakobsen
 Jakobsson